Edward Haigh may refer to:

 Ed Haigh (1867–1953), American baseball player
 Eddie Haigh (1935–2016), British trade unionist

See also
 Edward Haight (disambiguation)